The 2007 Major League Soccer All-Star Game was the 12th annual Major League Soccer All-Star Game. The 2007 MLS All-Star Game took place on July 19, 2007 between the 2007 MLS All-Stars and Celtic.

Dick's Sporting Goods Park, the new home stadium of the Colorado Rapids in Commerce City, CO, hosted the 2007 Sierra Mist All-Star Game.   This was the first time that Dick's Sporting Goods Park hosted the MLS All-Star game.

David Beckham made an appearance and participated in a special introduction to the fans on hand as well as in a halftime ESPN interview, and watched the game from the Commissioner's Box.

The MLS All-Stars defeated Celtic 2–0, giving them a perfect 4–0 record against international competition.

Background
Major League Soccer announced on Thursday, January 25, 2007 that Dick's Sporting Goods Park, the new home of the Colorado Rapids located just outside downtown Denver, will host the 2007 Sierra Mist MLS All-Star Game on July 19, pitting Scottish club Celtic FC against the best from MLS. MLS announced the news during a press conference at The Pinnacle Club in the Grand Hyatt featuring MLS Deputy Commissioner Ivan Gazidis and Colorado Rapids Managing Director Jeff Plush. "We are thrilled to welcome Celtic, one of the world's most popular teams, for a quality match against the best of MLS at our newest soccer cathedral, Dick's Sporting Goods Park," said MLS Commissioner Don Garber. "We look forward to an exciting evening in this tremendous new soccer-specific venue."

A week before the 2007 All-Star game the ColoradoRapids.com posted a news release on their website stating that less than 1,000 tickets remained for the 2007 Sierra Mist MLS All-Star Game on July 19 at Dick's Sporting Goods Park. Tickets for the All-Star Game went on sale to the public Saturday, May 5, 2007 at 10:00 am MT.

Celtic

Glasgow-based Celtic captured their 41st Scottish championship in April (2007), and featured such high-profile players as Polish goalkeeper Artur Boruc, Scottish defenders Steven Pressley and Stephen McManus, Japanese midfielder Shunsuke Nakamura, Danish midfielder Thomas Gravesen and Dutch striker Jan Vennegoor of Hesselink. Celtic has one of the most dedicated and widespread fan bases in all of club soccer, and were the first British club to win the European Cup in 1967. Celtic had a long and historic rivalry with fellow Glaswegian club Rangers, the two being known as the Old Firm.

2007 All-Star Game Rosters

Major League Soccer
Players in bold denotes First XI status.

Head coach: Steve Nicol (New England Revolution)

~ – Players selected by coach

† – "Commissioner's Picks"

Celtic FC

All-Star Selections By Club

Match details

|valign="top"|
|valign="top" width="50%"|

Notes

External links
2007 MLS All-Star Game Recap

2007
Mls All-Star Game 2007
Mls All-Star Game 2007
All-Star Game
MLS All-Star
July 2007 sports events in the United States
Commerce City, Colorado
Sports competitions in Colorado